Airicoto (possibly from Quechua ayri axe, qutu heap, "axe heap") is a mountain in the Chila mountain in the Andes of Peru, about  high. It is located in the Arequipa Region, Castilla Province, Choco District. It lies northeast of Quiscapampa and east of Yuraccacsa.

Airicoto is also the name of the valley west of the mountain. Its waters flow to Colca River in the south.

References 

Mountains of Peru
Mountains of Arequipa Region